The 2019 Ebonyi State gubernatorial election occurred on March 9, 2019. Incumbent PDP Governor Dave Umahi won re-election for a second term, defeating APC Sonni Ogbuoji and several minor party candidates.

Dave Umahi emerged PDP gubernatorial candidate unopposed. He picked Eric Kelechi Igwe as his running mate. Sonni Ogbuoji was the APC candidate with Justin Mbam Ogodo as his running mate. 37 candidates contested in the election.

Electoral system
The Governor of Ebonyi State is elected using the plurality voting system.

Primary election

PDP primary
The PDP primary election was held on September 30, 2018. Dave Umahi won the primary election unopposed.

Candidates
Party nominee: Dave Umahi: incumbent governor
Running mate: Eric Kelechi Igwe: incumbent deputy governor

APC primary
The APC primary election was held on September 30, 2018. Sonni Ogbuoji won the primary election polling 785 votes against 8 other candidates. His closest rival was Bernard Odoh, the immediate past secretary to the state government of Ebonyi, who came second with 519 votes. Edward Nkwegu came third with 395 votes.

Candidates
Party nominee: Sonni Ogbuoji: Nigerian senator
Running mate: Justin Mbam Ogodo
Bernard Odoh: Immediate past secretary to the state government of Ebonyi
Edward Nkwegu
Ogbonnaya Obasi
Austine Edeeze
Paul Okorie
Emmanuel Agboti
Kelechi Chima
Christian Chukwu

Results
A total number of 37 candidates registered with the Independent National Electoral Commission to contest in the election.

The total number of registered voters in the state was 1,432,528, while 497,291 voters were accredited. Total number of votes cast was 493,002, while number of valid votes was 482,018. Rejected votes were 10,984.

By local government area
Here are the results of the election by local government area for the two major parties. The total valid votes of 482,018 represents the 37 political parties that participated in the election. Green represents LGAs won by Dave Umahi. Blue represents LGAs won by Sonni Ogbuoji.

References 

Ebonyi
Ebonyi State gubernatorial elections
Ebonyi State gubernatorial election
2019 Ebonyi State elections